Fourteen referendums were held in Switzerland in 1977. The first three were held on 13 March on popular initiatives on foreign infiltration, limiting naturalisation and changing the rules on referendums on treaties (which also had a counter-proposal). All three were rejected, whilst the counter-proposal was approved. The next two were held on 12 June on changes to sales tax and direct federal taxation (rejected) and on tax harmonisation (approved).

The next set of referendums was held on 25 September on popular initiatives on protecting tenants (rejected, with a counter-proposal also rejected), air pollution caused by motor vehicles (rejected), and a law allowing abortion in the first trimester of pregnancy (rejected), as well as on two government proposals to raise the number of signatures required for optional referendums (approved) and popular initiatives (approved).

The final four referendums were held on 4 December on a popular initiative on a wealth tax (rejected) and three federal law on political rights (approved), creating a civilian alternative to military service (rejected) and on balancing the federal budget (approved).

Results

March: Foreign infiltration

March: Limiting naturalisation

March: Changes to treaty referendums

June: Changes to sales tax and direct federal tax

June: Tax harmonisation

September: Protection of tenants

September: Air pollution

September: Increasing the number of signatures required for optional referendums

September: Increasing the number of signatures required for popular initiatives

September: Abortion

December: Wealth tax

December: Political rights

December: Civilian service

December: Balancing the federal budget

References

1977 referendums
1977 in Switzerland
Referendums in Switzerland
Abortion referendums